The Battle of Lutetia was a battle on the plain of Grenelle in what is now Paris between Roman forces under Titus Labienus and an anti-Roman Gallic coalition in 52 BC during the Gallic Wars. It was a Roman victory.

Prelude
Caesar sent Labienus to campaign against the peoples of the Seine, whilst Caesar himself marched on Gergovia. He captured the oppidum of Metlosedum (possibly present-day Melun), and crossed the Seine to attack the  Gallic coalition near Lutetia. Threatened by the Bellovaci (a  powerful Belgae tribe), he decided to re-cross the Seine to rejoin Caesar's force at Agedincum (Sens). Feinting a general retreat, Labienus in fact crossed the river. The Gauls of the Seine coalition tried to block his path to Caesar and battle was joined.

Battle
After the two sides engaged the Seventh legion, placed on the right wing, started to push back the Gallic left. On the Roman left the Twelfth legion's pilum volleys broke up the Gauls first charge, but they resisted the Romans advance, encouraged by their old chieftain Camulogenus. The turning point came when the military tribunes of the Seventh legion led their legionaries against the enemy rear. The Gauls sent in their reserves, taking a nearby hill, but were unable to reverse the course of the battle and took flight. Their losses increased when the Roman cavalry was sent to pursue them. Labienus's force thus advanced back to Agedincum, recaptured their baggage train along the way.

Aftermath
The Gauls tried to prevent Labienus from returning to Agedincum by blocking him at the Sequana river. Labienus used five cohorts to lure the Gauls away while he himself crossed the Sequana River with three legions. When the Gauls found out there were two Roman armies in the area they split up and pursued both. The main body met Labienus who pinned them down with one legion while surrounding them with the rest. He then annihilated their reinforcements with his cavalry. After linking up with the five cohorts he had used as a diversion, Labienus marched his army back to Agendicum where he met up with Caesar returning from his defeat at Gergovia. The combined Roman army would soon after march from Agendicum to face Vercingetorix's victorious army coming from the south. After defeating the Gauls near the Vingeanne, Caesar pursued them to Alesia where he won a decisive victory over Vercingetorix.

Notes and References

52 BC
Lutetia
Lutetia
History of Paris